De Zwaan is an authentic Dutch windmill in the city of Holland, Michigan. The windmill's name is Dutch for The Swan or Graceful Bird. It is the oldest authentic, working Dutch windmill in the United States. De Zwaan is located in Windmill Island municipal park.

History
When Holland, Michigan residents Willard Wichers and Carter Brown were looking for a way to pay homage to the city's Dutch heritage, they began a project to bring a Dutch windmill to the United States. However, many of these monumental structures had suffered serious damage in World War II. As a result, the Dutch government had placed a ban on the sale of windmills outside the Netherlands. Wichers and his group were able to gain an exemption by selecting a heavily damaged mill known as De Zwaan that had been in operation in Vinkel Netherlands since being moved there in 1884 by a family named Van Schayk.  De Zwaan was at the center of a controversy, with three local agencies unable to determine the future of the damaged windmill. The Dutch government decided to sell it to Wichers for $2800, making De Zwaan the last windmill to leave the Netherlands. Windmill authorities in the Netherlands provided the City of Holland with the history of De Zwaan, noting that it had been built in Krommenie, Netherlands, in 1761 as a grain mill set on a raised base to better capture the wind.

In October, 1964, De Zwaan arrived aboard the Prins Willem van Oranje. It was unloaded at the Muskegon harbor and transported by truck to Windmill Island in Holland. It took approximately 6 months to reconstruct the mill. The city erected a raised base rather than the mound of earth it had been set on in Vinkel so as to restore it to its original design when it stood in Krommenie. Once erected, the City of Holland celebrated as having been over 200 years old at the time.

In April 1965, the  windmill was formally dedicated on Windmill Island, a  site reclaimed from a swamp on the eastern end of Lake Macatawa. It is open from late April through early October.

When winds are favorable ( from the west), De Zwaan's  diameter blades are usually in motion.

In 2015, the City of Holland celebrated the 50th anniversary of De Zwaan being in Holland. In preparation for the celebration, De Zwaan's resident Miller and historian, Alisa Crawford, set out to author the only definitive book ever written about De Zwaan.  Alisa Crawford holds a master’s degree in museum studies and is the only Dutch certified miller in the United States, an accreditation she earned after years of independent study while working for the City of Holland at De Zwaan. In seeking data about De Zwaan’s original construction, Crawford learned that  the De Zwaan in Krommenie had been taken down in 1887, which was three years after De Zwaan had been relocated to Vinkel. She realized that there had, in fact, been at least two windmills in the Netherlands named De Zwaan.

Ultimately Crawford was able to prove the De Zwaan windmill moved to Holland, Michigan, had originally been erected in the city of Dordrecht in South Holland as a zaagmolen (sawmill) in 1833. The mill was converted to steam power in 1884 and its eight-sided body, cap, and blades become superfluous. At that point the Van Schayk family purchased it for relocation to Vinkel. They also purchased parts from a different mill, likely the Nooitgedacht (Never Thought) that had been built in 1800 in 's-Hertogenbosch (now Den Bosch), and dismantled in 1883.  

This information led to the understanding that De Zwaan was about 70 years younger than the City of Holland was led to believe when it acquired the windmill in 1964 and was a hybrid mill built from the structure and components from two to three other mills. Crawford notes "that lineage is what makes De Zwaan unequivocally authentic. Windmills were and continue to be working machines. When they break, they are repaired. When the parts wear out, they are replaced.  When they became outmoded, they are repurposed."   

There is, unfortunately, a lot of inaccurate information in newspapers published between 1964 and 2015 about the origins of De Zwaan. Additionally not all online sources have revised the original build date of De Zwaan.

National Register of Historic Places
After the publication of her book, De Zwaan: The True Story of America's Authentic Dutch Windmill, Alisa Crawford wrote the nomination of De Zwaan to the National Register of Historic Places on behalf of the City of Holland. The mill was listed on the National Register of Historic Places in 2018.

The City of Holland erected a State Historic Marker at De Zwaan in 2019. The text on side one reads: "In 1961 Castle Park resort owner Carter P. Brown proposed the idea of creating a public park with 'an authentic Dutch windmill,' a symbol of Holland's Dutch heritage. To do so, city officials needed permission from the Dutch government, which protects windmills as national monuments. Willard C. Wichers, Midwest director for the Netherlands Information Service, led negotiations with the Dutch over a three-year period. In June 1964 he traveled to the Netherlands to find a suitable mill and finalize arrangements to buy and move it. In Vinkel, North Brabant, stood a mill that had been built in 1884 using pieces from older Mills. Named De Zwaan (the Swan), it had been damaged during World War II and had deteriorated. Dutch officials allowed its sale but required that Dutch millwright Jan D. Medendorp supervise its relocation and restoration."

See also 
Tulip Time

References

External links

Windmill Island Gardens - official site
About Holland PDF
Windmill marks 40 years in Holland
Windmill De Zwaan more than just a symbol of Holland City’s roots 

National Register of Historic Places in Ottawa County, Michigan
Dutch-American culture in Michigan
Buildings and structures in Holland, Michigan
Museums in Ottawa County, Michigan
Tourist attractions in Ottawa County, Michigan
Smock mills in the United States
Grinding mills in Michigan
Relocated buildings and structures in Michigan
Octagonal buildings in the United States
Wind power in Michigan
Buildings and structures completed in 1761
Mill museums in Michigan
Agricultural buildings and structures in Michigan
Windmills on the National Register of Historic Places